Teupah Barat is a district of the Simeulue Regency on Simeulue island in the Indonesian province of Aceh.  As of 2005 it had a total population of 6,810 people, living in 1,379 households.

Administrative divisions
Teupah Barat is divided administratively into 18 desa / kelurahan:

 Angkeo
 Awe Kecil
 Awe Seubal
 Bunon
 Inor
 La'ayon
Lantik
 Leubang
 Leubang Hulu
 Maudil
 Naibos
 Nancala
 Pulau Teupah
 Salur
 Salur Lasengalu
 Salur Latun
 Silengas
 Sital

References

Districts of Aceh